Ahugan may refer to:
 Ahugan, Qaleh Ganj, Kerman Province
 Ahugan, Sistan and Baluchestan